Raphaël Confiant (born January 25, 1951) is a Martinican writer known for his literary commitment towards Creole literature.

Life and career
Raphaël Confiant was born in Le Lorrain, Martinique. He studied English and political science at the Sciences Po Aix and law at Paul Cézanne University in Aix-en-Provence, France.  During the 1970s, Confiant became a militant proponent of use of the Creole language and later worked with Jean Bernabé and Patrick Chamoiseau to create the  movement.  The three authors co-authored in 1989 the seminal text of the  movement, in addition to other theoretical texts.  The  movement is often characterized as a reaction to the  movement, which emphasized the African origins of the Antillean people.  The  movement, on the other hand, emphasizes the diversity of Antillean ancestry and cultural heritage, which includes Chinese, Indian, and European influences, among others.  The movement seeks to understand the diverse identities and histories of the people of the Antilles through the lens of literature and language and eschews the universal in favor of a diverse view of language and identity.

Confiant is a well-known writer in both Creole and French and is currently a lecturer at the University of the French West Indies and Guiana (UAG).

After publishing his first novels in Creole and suffering very poor sales, Confiant took another approach in 1988 by publishing his first French-language novel, set in Martinique during World War II. The novel was welcomed by the French literary crowd as a new voice in French-language literature. Narrowly missing the Goncourt Prize in 1991 with his second French novel, Confiant has ever since continued writing in French, even translating his first Creole-language novels.

Bibliography
 In Creole:
 Jik dèyè do Bondyé, short stories, 1979
 Jou Baré, poems, 1981
 Bitako-a, novel, 1985
 Kòd Yanm, novel, 1986
 Marisosé, novel, 1987
 Dictionnaires des titim et sirandanes, 1997
 In French:
 Le Nègre et l'Amiral, novel, 1988, Prix Antigone
 Eloge de la créolité, essay, 1989 (with Jean Bernabé and Patrick Chamoiseau)
 Lettres créoles: tracées antillaises et continentales de la littérature (1635–1975), essay, 1991
 Eau de Café, novel 1991, Prix Novembre
 Ravines du devant-jour, narration, 1993, Prix Casa de las Americas
 Commandeur du sucre, narration, 1993
 Aimé Césaire, une traversée paradoxale du siècle, essay, 1993
 L'Allée des Soupirs, novel, 1994, Prix Carbet de la Caraïbe et du Tout-Monde
 Bassin des ouragans, narration, 1994
 Les maîtres de la parole créole, story, 1995
 Contes créoles, story, 1995
 Le Gouverneur des dés, narration, 1995
 Mamzelle Libellule, novel, 1995
 La Savane des pétrifications, narration, 1995
 La Vierge du Grand Retour, novel, 1996
 La baignoire de Joséphine, narration, 1997
 Le Meurtre de Samedi-Gloria, novel, 1997, Prix RFO du livre
 L'archet du colonel, novel, 1998
 Régisseur du rhum, narration, 1999
 Le Cahier de Romance, narration, 2000
 Brin d'amour, novel, 2001
 Nuée ardente, narration, 2002
 La Panse du Chacal, novel, 2004
 Adele et la Pacotillieuse, novel, 2005

References

"Les principaux courants littéraires antillais."  Retrieved July 22, 2005.
Hazaël-Massieux, Marie-Christine.  "Raphaël Confiant."    Retrieved July 23, 2005.

External links
 Curry, Ginette. "Toubab La!": Literary Representations of Mixed-race Characters in the African Diaspora.Cambridge Scholars Pub., Newcastle, England.2007 .

 Chains Deep in the Mind

1951 births
Living people
People from Le Lorrain
Martiniquais writers
French people of Martiniquais descent
French male writers
Paul Cézanne University alumni
Sciences Po Aix alumni
Prix Décembre winners
Créolité